Pedro Giampier de la Cruz Espinoza (born 15 January 2002) is a Peruvian footballer who plays as a midfielder for Santos de Nasca, on loan from Alianza Lima.

Career statistics

Club

Notes

References

2002 births
Living people
Footballers from Lima
Peruvian footballers
Peru youth international footballers
Association football midfielders
Peruvian Segunda División players
Club Alianza Lima footballers
Santos de Nasca players